Scream is the eleventh  studio album by English heavy metal singer Ozzy Osbourne, released in the United Kingdom on 14 June 2010. The album was recorded at Osbourne's home studio "The Bunker" in Los Angeles, California and produced by himself and Kevin Churko, who had previously worked on Black Rain in 2007. The album was considered commercially disappointing in comparison to Osbourne's earlier work, though it was a moderate success by reaching 4 on the U.S. Billboard 200 chart and number 12 on the UK Albums Chart.

The album was originally to have been titled Soul Sucka, but this was changed before release to Scream after fans voiced their objections. It is Osbourne's only album to feature guitarist Gus G, who replaced long-term guitarist Zakk Wylde. The drums on the album were recorded by Kevin Churko, though Tommy Clufetos was credited, as he was touring with Osbourne's band at the time. Scream is also the first release to feature keyboardist Adam Wakeman, who had  worked with Osbourne as a touring musician since 2004. The lead single released from the album was "Let Me Hear You Scream", which peaked at number 6 on the American Rock Songs chart. It is Osbourne's first album since 1986's The Ultimate Sin to use his classic logo on the cover art.

A 2-CD, "Tour Edition" version of the album was released in the U.S. on 5 October 2010. This package contains the original album on disc 1 and a second CD with seven bonus songs: "One More Time" (originally an iTunes pre-order exclusive), "Jump the Moon" (originally a bonus track on the Japanese release), and "Hand of the Enemy" (previously unreleased) from the Scream sessions, and four additional live tracks recorded during the UK leg of the Scream tour: "Bark at the Moon", "Let Me Hear You Scream", "No More Tears" and a live recording of Black Sabbath's "Fairies Wear Boots". A four-sided vinyl edition, containing the aforementioned studio tracks along with the live version of "Let Me Hear You Scream" and the single version of "Life Won't Wait", is also available.

Background
To promote the album, an Ozzy Osbourne track pack had been released as downloadable content for the Rock Band video game series, containing three Scream songs and three of Ozzy's greatest hits. "Let Me Hear You Scream", "Soul Sucker" and "Diggin' Me Down" were released on 15 June 2010, alongside three songs from Osbourne's earlier albums: "I Don't Wanna Stop" (from Black Rain), "Crazy Babies" (from No Rest for the Wicked) and "No More Tears"  (from the album of the same title).

Another promotional event occurred at Dodger Stadium in Los Angeles on 12 June 2010. In the middle of the fifth inning of a game between the Los Angeles Dodgers and Los Angeles Angels, Osbourne encouraged the crowd to scream the title of the album as loud and as long as possible. The goal was to set the Guinness World Record for the loudest and longest scream by a crowd; the attempt succeeded. Although the official decibel level has not been announced, the stadium beat the previous record set by a group of Finnish Boy Scouts, which was 127.2 dBA. The money earned was donated to ThinkCure! to aid cancer research. Osbourne also appeared on many new commercials, video games, albums, etc. to promote the album.

"Let Me Hear You Scream" hit number 1 on the US Mainstream Rock Tracks chart, which is Osbourne's second single to achieve such a feat. The song was featured along with "Crazy Train" in the video game Madden NFL 11.
 
"Life Won't Wait" reached No. 1 on the Mediabase rock chart in Canada, making it his third single to achieve such a feat. "Life Won't Wait" was announced in the Production Notes, and played during the end credits for the horror film Saw 3D.

CBS had also promoted the song "Let Me Hear You Scream" in their television show CSI: NY and it was also featured in the 6th-season episode "Redemption".

Track listing

Personnel

Musicians
Ozzy Osbourne – vocals, production
Gus G – guitars
Rob "Blasko" Nicholson – bass
Adam Wakeman – keyboards
Tommy Clufetos – drums (credit only)

Additional personnel
Kevin Churko – drums, percussion, production, engineering, mixing
Kane Churko – Pro Tools engineering
Bob Ludwig – mastering
Meghan Foley – art direction, graphic design
Jennifer Tzar – art direction, photography
Josh Cheuse, Jeff Gilligan – graphic design

Charts

Weekly charts

Year-end charts

Certifications

Release history

References

External links
 

Ozzy Osbourne albums
Epic Records albums
Albums produced by Kevin Churko
2010 albums